Trikolonoi is a former municipality in Arcadia, Peloponnese, Greece. Since the 2011 local government reform it is part of the municipality Gortynia, of which it is a municipal unit. The municipal unit has an area of 102.031 km2. The municipal unit includes the villages of Stemnitsa (the former municipal seat), Syrna, Pavlia, Palamari and Elliniko. Trikolonoi is located southeast of Dimitsana, west of Tripoli and north of Megalopoli. In 2011 Trikolonoi had a population of 578. The place takes its name from the ancient town of Tricoloni.

Subdivisions
The municipal unit Trikolonoi is subdivided into the following communities (constituent villages in brackets):
Elliniko
Palamari (Palamari, Psari)
Pavlia
Stemnitsa (Stemnitsa, Moni Agiou Ioannou Prodromou)
Syrna (Syrna, Ano Kalyvia)

Population history

See also
List of settlements in Arcadia

References

External links
Official website of Gortynia
GTP - Trikolonoi

Populated places in Arcadia, Peloponnese